The 1962–63 Divizia B was the 23rd season of the second tier of the Romanian football league system.

The format has been maintained to three series, each of them having 14 teams. At the end of the season the winners of the series promoted to Divizia A and the last four places from each series relegated to Divizia C.

Team changes

To Divizia B
Promoted from Regional Championship
 AS Cugir
 Dinamo Tecuci
 IMU Medgidia
 Metalul Turnu Severin
 Progresul Alexandria
 Unirea Dej

Relegated from Divizia A
 Jiul Petroșani
 Metalul Târgoviște
 Dinamo Pitești

From Divizia B
Relegated to Regional Championship
 Dinamo Suceava
 Olimpia București
 Rapid Târgu Mureș
 Steaua Roșie Bacău
 Portul Constanța
 Corvinul Hunedoara

Promoted to Divizia A
 CSMS Iași
 Farul Constanța
 Crișana Oradea

Renamed teams 
CFR Arad was renamed as CFR-IRTA Arad.

Chimia Govora was renamed as Unirea Râmnicu Vâlcea.

CSM Mediaș was renamed as Gaz Metan Mediaș.

CSM Baia Mare was renamed as Minerul Baia Mare.

CSO Brăila was renamed as Progresul Brăila.

CSO Timișoara was renamed as CFR Timișoara.

Dinamo Tecuci was renamed as Flamura Roșie Tecuci.

Unirea Dej was renamed as Steaua Dej.

Other teams 
Jiul Petroșani was moved from Petroșani to Petrila and renamed as Jiul Petrila.

League tables

Serie I

Serie II

Serie III

See also 

 1962–63 Divizia A

References

Liga II seasons
Romania
2